Renata Flores Rivera is a Peruvian singer, made famous in South America by a viral Quechua cover of Michael Jackson's "The Way You Make Me Feel", released in 2015.

Career 
Flores began studying Quechua at the age of 13, and, growing in fluency, continued to do so at university. She translated "The Way You Make Me Feel" with help from Ada, her 72-year-old grandmother. In 2014, she participated in "The Voice Kids Peru", a Peruvian talent show. She went on to release several original trap songs in her ancestral language of Quechua, the lyrics often addressing issues faced by  indigenous communities in Peru.

In March 2021, Flores released her first album, Isqun, largely in Quechua. She also appeared (again speaking Quechua) in adverts for a perfume brand.

Singles

As lead artist

References 

2001 births
Living people
People from Ayacucho
21st-century Peruvian women singers
21st-century Peruvian singers
Quechua-language singers
Peruvian people of Quechua descent
Indigenous activists of the Americas
Indigenous musicians of the Americas
Latin trap musicians